Machairado is a village in the central part of the island of Zakynthos, Greece. It was the seat of the municipality of Artemisia. In 2011 its population was 941. It is situated at the foot of low mountains, 1 km north of Lagopodo, 3 km northeast of Koiliomenos and 8 km southwest of Zakynthos (city). The village suffered great damage from the 1953 Ionian earthquake.

Population

See also
List of settlements in Zakynthos

References

External links
Machairado at the GTP Travel Pages

Populated places in Zakynthos